Di•a•lects, Music for solo synthesizers and voices is an album by Joe Zawinul that was released in 1986. It was created by Zawinul alone with his programmed synths and rhythm machines, using vocoders on his own vox and importing Bobby McFerrin’s improvised onomatopoetics and a vocal trio singing in a Zawinul-created language on other tracks." The AllMusic reviewer concluded, "This is an important, overlooked album because it proves that electronic instruments can reach your emotions and shake your body when played by someone who has bothered to learn how to master them."

Track listing 
All tracks composed by Joe Zawinul
 "The Harvest" – 6:04
 "Waiting for the Rain" – 7:38
 "Zeebop" – 4:50
 "The Great Empire" – 3:57
 "Carnavalito" – 6:18
 "6 A.M./Walking on the Nile" – 7:06
 "Peace" – 6:49

Personnel 
 Joe Zawinul – synthesizers, vocals
 Bobby McFerrin – vocals
 Carl Anderson – vocals
 Dee Dee Bellson – vocals
 Alfie Silas – vocals

Production
 Joe Zawinul - producer, design
 George Butler - executive producer
 Peter Kelsey - engineer
 Paul Ericksen - second engineer
 Bernie Grundman - mastering
 Corvalan-Condliffe Management - management
 Joseph Futterer - art direction
 Richie Powell - art direction
 Vivian Bremner - illustration

References

1986 albums
Joe Zawinul albums
Columbia Records albums